Emmerich Kálmán (24 October 1882 – 30 October 1953) was a Hungarian composer of operettas and a prominent figure in the development of Viennese operetta in the 20th century. Among his most popular works are Die Csárdásfürstin (1915) and Gräfin Mariza (1924). Influences on his compositional style include Hungarian folk music (such as the csárdás), the Viennese style of precursors such as Johann Strauss II and Franz Lehár, and, in his later works, American jazz. As a result of the Anschluss, Kálmán and his family fled to Paris and then to the United States. He eventually returned to Europe in 1949 and died in Paris in 1953.

Biography

Kálmán was born Imre Koppstein in Siófok, then in Austria-Hungary, on the southern shore of Lake Balaton, to a Jewish family. Kálmán initially intended to become a concert pianist, but because of early-onset arthritis, he focused on composition instead. He studied music theory and composition at the National Hungarian Royal Academy of Music (then the Budapest Academy of Music), where he was a fellow student of Béla Bartók and Zoltán Kodály under Hans Kössler.

His early symphonic poems Saturnalia and Endre és Johanna were well-received, although he failed to achieve publication. He also composed piano music and wrote many songs: a song cycle on poems by Ludwig Jacobowski and a song collection published under the title Dalai.

However, the popularity of his humorous cabaret songs led him towards the composition of operettas. Thereafter he moved to Vienna, where he achieved worldwide fame through his operettas Der Zigeunerprimas, Die Csárdásfürstin, Gräfin Mariza, and Die Zirkusprinzessin.

Kálmán and Franz Lehár were the leading composers of what has been called the "Silver Age" of Viennese operetta during the first quarter of the 20th century. He became well known for his fusion of Viennese waltz with Hungarian csárdás. Even so, polyphonically and melodically, Kálmán was a devoted follower of Giacomo Puccini, while in his orchestration methods he employed principles characteristic of Tchaikovsky's music.

In 1929, his first child (with Vera Mendelsohn), Charles Kalman (1929–2015) was born and would later on be also a composer.

Despite his Jewish origins he was one of Adolf Hitler's favorite composers. After the Anschluss, he rejected Hitler's offer to become an 'honorary Aryan' and was forced to move first to Paris, then to the United States, settling in California in 1940.

Last years and death
Following his emigration, performances of his works were prohibited in Nazi Germany. He emigrated back to Vienna from New York in 1949 before moving in 1951 to Paris, where he died.

Popular culture
In 1958 a West German biopic The Csardas King was made of his life, starring Gerhard Riedmann in the lead role.

The supporters of both the national football and handball team of Iceland use his composition Das Veilchen vom Montmartre as their anthem.

Operettas
 Tatárjárás (The Mongol Invasion) – Budapest, 1908
 Ein Herbstmanöver – Vienna, 1909 (German version of Tatárjárás)
 The Gay Hussars – Knickerbocker Theatre, Broadway, New York, 1909 (American version of Tatárjárás)
 Autumn Manoeuvres – London, 1912 (English version of Tatárjárás)
 Az obsitos (The Veteran) – Budapest, 1910
 Der gute Kamerad – Vienna, 1911 (German revision of Az Obsitos)
 Gold gab ich für Eisen – Vienna, 1914 (revision of Der gute Kamerad)
 Her Soldier Boy – Astor Theatre, Lyric Theastre, Shubert Theatre, New York, 1916/17
 Soldier Boy – London, 1918
 Der Zigeunerprimas (The Gypsy Band Leader) – Vienna, 1912
 Sari – Liberty Theatre, New Amsterdam Theatre, New York, 1914
 The Blue House – London, 1912
 Der kleine König (The Little King) – Vienna, 1912
 Zsuzsi kisasszony – Budapest, 1915
 Miss Springtime – New Amsterdam Theatre, New York, 1916/17
 Die Faschingsfee – Vienna, 1917 (German revision of Zsuzsi kisasszony)
 Die Csárdásfürstin – Vienna, 1915
 The Riviera Girl – New Amsterdam Theatre, New York, 1917
 The Gipsy Princess – London, 1921
 Das Hollandweibchen – Vienna, 1920
 A Little Dutch Girl – London, 1920
 La Holandesita – Spain, 1921 (Spanish version by Casimiro Giralt)
 The Dutch Girl – U.S., 1925
 Die Bajadere – Vienna, 1921
 The Yankee Princess – Knickerbocker Theatre, New York, 1922
 Gräfin Mariza – Vienna, 1924
 Countess Maritza – Shubert Theatre, New York, 1926/27, with Yvonne d'Arle in the title role.
 Maritza – London, 1938
 Die Zirkusprinzessin – Vienna, 1926
 The Circus Princess – Winter Garden Theatre, New York, 1927
 Golden Dawn – Hammerstein's Theatre, New York, 1927/28
 Die Herzogin von Chicago – Vienna, 1928
 The Duchess of Chicago – U.S., 1929
 Das Veilchen vom Montmartre – Vienna, 1930
 Paris in Spring – U.S., 1930
 A Kiss in Spring – London, 1932
 Der Teufelsreiter (Az ördöglovas – The Devil Rider) – Vienna, 1932
 Kaiserin Josephine – Zurich, 1936
 Miss Underground – written 1942, unproduced
 Marinka – Winter Garden Theatre, Ethel Barrymore Theatre, New York, 1945
 Arizona Lady – Bern, 1954

References
Notes

Further reading 
 Clarke, Kevin. Im Himmel spielt auch schon die Jazzband. Emmerich Kálmán und die transatlantische Operette 1928–1932. Hamburg: von Bockel Verlag, 2007 . (examines Kálmán's jazz-operettas of the 1920s, with extensive English quotes from historical Broadway- and West End reviews)
 Historical reviews and a biography/worklist by Kurt Gänzl
 
 Nagibin, Yuri. Вечная музыка [Eternal Music]. Russia, ACT, 2004. . (pp. 201–345)

External links 

 
 Links to numerous Kálmán recordings
 
 

1882 births
1953 deaths
People from Siófok
Hungarian Jews
Jewish classical composers
Hungarian emigrants to the United States
Hungarian musical theatre composers
Hungarian opera composers
Male opera composers
Jewish opera composers
American people of Hungarian-Jewish descent
Franz Liszt Academy of Music alumni
20th-century Hungarian male musicians